Oscar August Laper, Jr. (July 13, 1915 in Markesan, Wisconsin – September 29, 1996 in Baraboo, Wisconsin), was a member of the Wisconsin State Assembly. He graduated from Northwestern College in 1937.

Career
Laper served as president of the Wisconsin Association of Soil Conservation Districts in the 1960s. He was elected to the Assembly in 1966 and was re-elected in 1968. Additionally, he was Treasurer and Chairman of Excelsior, Sauk County, Wisconsin, as well as a member of the school board. He was a Republican.

References

External links

People from Markesan, Wisconsin
People from Sauk County, Wisconsin
School board members in Wisconsin
1915 births
1996 deaths
20th-century American politicians
Republican Party members of the Wisconsin State Assembly